Acritus nigricornis is a species of clown beetle in the family Histeridae. It is found in Africa, Australia, Europe, Northern Asia (excluding China), North America, and Southern Asia.

References

Further reading

External links

 

Histeridae
Articles created by Qbugbot
Beetles described in 1803